The women's team table tennis event was part of the table tennis programme and took place between November 13 and 16, at the Guangzhou Gymnasium.

Schedule
All times are China Standard Time (UTC+08:00)

Results

Round robin

Group A

Group B

Group C

Group D

Knockout round

Quarterfinals

Semifinals

Final

Non-participating athletes

References

 Official Report – Women's team

External links
Official site: Sports News.  Schedule and Results

Table tennis at the 2010 Asian Games